The following is a list of characters from the anime Space Runaway Ideon.

Solo Colonists

Cosmo Yuki

Cosmo Yuki is the male lead of Space Runaway Ideon. Originally a teenager living on Solo with his archaeologist father, Cosmo is thrust into the role of mecha pilot when the Buff Clan attacks. He is the pilot of the Ideo-Delta/Sol Conver and the lead pilot of the Ideon in its combined form. Although he has the occasional fight with Bes, Cosmo is a well-respected member of the Solo Ship crew.

Later on, after half his friends are killed and the situation gradually becomes bleaker, Cosmo's distraught turns into pure rage and determination, becoming the Ide's physical medium for its grim final purpose. With nothing left to lose, Cosmo conducts a last-ditch attack against the Gando Rowa and the Bairaru Jin, resulting in the destruction of the Ideon, Gando Rawa, Solo Ship, and much of the Buff Clan fleet.

Cosmo is reunited in spirit form with Kitty Kitten (a rebel who appears in one of the final episodes) and Kasha at the end of Be Invoked. When Kitty goes off with another, Cosmo and Kasha head off together into their new eternity.

Bes Jordan

An Earth soldier stationed on Solo who becomes the captain of the Solo ship after the Buff Clan attack. Although Bes initially pilots the Ideo-Nova/Sol Vainer, he retires from piloting when it becomes apparent that younger pilots have more success with piloting the Ideon.  Although he occasionally quarrels with Cosmo and Sheryl, Bes is well liked and respected as the leader of the Solo Ship.

Bes develops feelings for Karala immediately upon meeting her and is quick to support her, even early in the series when she is distrusted by others among the Solo Ship's crew.  The two eventually fall in love and Karala becomes pregnant with his child, although it is never born due to her death.

In the final battle between the surviving Solo colonists and the Buff Clan, Bes continues fighting against invading squads of Buff Clan troops on board the Solo Ship. Though he is shot in the waist and in the neck, gradually bleeding to death, he remains the only person "alive" on the ship.

Shortly after, he dies along with everyone else as the Gando Rowa's incredible power destroys the Solo Ship.

He is reunited in spirit form with Karala in the end. Their son, Messiah, leads them and the souls of everyone else to a reborn Earth.

Kasha Imhof

A teenage girl who is friends with Cosmo and Deck on Solo, Kasha quickly becomes involved in the fighting when the Buff Clan launch their attack on Solo.  Kasha becomes the main pilot of the Ideo-Buster/Sol-Amber.  Although a good pilot, Kasha is quite hot tempered and aggressive, which can get her in trouble at times.  Like Cosmo, she at times conflicts with the opinions on the adults on the ship.  She is also one of the people most critical of Karala early on in the series.

As Ideon draws to a close, Kasha relinquishes her piloting duties of the Ideo-Buster to Deck so she can remain aboard the Solo Ship and protect Karala. During an intense exchange of fire between the Solo Ship's remaining crew and the Buff Clan, Kasha is killed after shrapnel from an explosion tears into her.

After the final invocation, Kasha's spirit, along with Deck, watches over a sleeping Cosmo and, after Kitty Kitten arrives and Deck leaves, sees Cosmo reawaken with Kitty. After Kitty leaves with another, Kasha and Cosmo head off together into eternity.

Sheryl Formosa

A linguistic scholar who has been investigating the Sixth Civilization on the Planet Solo.  Sheryl's primary interest is studying the Ide, the mysterious energy source that powers both the Ideon and the Solo Ship.  She becomes quite obsessed with it at times, which leads to conflicts between her, Bes, Cosmo, and Kasha. Sheryl also conflicts with Karala early on in the series. Nonetheless, Sheryl is a valuable crew member who is always willing to put herself in dangerous situations to find the answers to her questions.

In the latter part of the series, Sheryl befriends Buff Clan defector Gije Zaral, who shares a similar interest in the Ide. The two fall in love, but Gije is killed on the planet Steckin Star in the second to last episode.  This, combined with the murder of her younger sister, Lin, on the planet Ajian, cause Sheryl to spiral into a state of despair and alcoholism followed by psychosis. In order to draw out the full potential of the Ide, Sheryl carries the infant Piper Lou onto the deck of the Solo Ship while the Ideon is fighting off both the Buff Clan and a large comet. Sheryl, consumed by grief and vengeance, "invokes" the Ide to show its true power by putting Piper Lou in mortal danger, taunting the invisible force if its strength comes from the suffering of the innocent. She receives her answer when the Ideon fires its Wave Leader Gun. The resulting shock wave from the blast kills her instantly, hurling her shattered body into space, though Lou survives the blast.

As she dies, Gije pulls Sheryl's spirit out of her body, reuniting them prior to the final cataclysms of Be Invoked. Later on, at the end of Be Invoked, both she and Gije reunite with the others.

Hatari Naburu

A pilot who survives the Buff Clan attack on New Lopia in the second episode and is one of the refugees who boards the Solo ship. Hatari becomes a subordinate and confidante of Bes, even taking control of the Solo ship's operations when Bes falls ill.

During the final battle with the Buff Clan in Be Invoked, Hatari manages to warp the Solo ship to the Buff Clan's mothership, the Gando Rowa. Unfortunately, he is shot in the side of the head and chest in the crossfire between the colonists and Buff Clan troopers aboard the bridge.

At the end of Be Invoked, his spirit reunites with Moera and Rapoh.

Deck Afta

A boy who is a friend of Cosmo's and Kasha's on Solo. He's generally seen with Rapappa, a tame two-tailed squirrel perched on his shoulder.

Although just a young kid, Deck desires to become a pilot of the Ideon and when Cosmo sees how dedicated he is to it, he allows Deck to become his co-pilot on the Ideo-Delta. As expected for his age, Deck is immature at times, but, for the most part, gets along with everyone, though gradually, as the series progresses, he begins to prove himself as a pilot, establishing himself as a predominant role in controlling the Ideon.

Deck is vaporized instantly when the Ideon is destroyed by the Gando Rowa.

Afterwards, both his spirit and Kasha are seen watching over a sleeping Cosmo. When Kitty Kitten arrives and Deck tells her what happens, Kitty tells him to go on ahead, saying that she and Kasha will look after Cosmo. Strangely, and harshly, enough, Rapappa's spirit form is never seen at the end of the film.

Joliver Ira
The engineer of the Solo Ship. At first, and throughout the series, he doesn't put too much trust in Karala, but during the movie Be Invoked, he admits to having falling in love with her. This is further proved after he protects Karala from her father, sustaining a sword wound to the back, and dying later as he assists the Ideon during the final battle.

After the final invocation, Joliver surprisingly ends up with Haruru's subordinate, Kilaru, in the new universe.

Moera Fatima

A member of the Solo Ship's crew who serves as the main pilot for the Ideo Nova for the majority of the series.  He is romantically involved with the ship's doctor, Rapoh.  He is also seen chastising Fard on several occasions for his wimpy behavior, encouraging him to stand up for himself and become a man.  He is eventually killed during a battle against the Buff Clan and his duties as the pilot of the Ideo Nova are passed on to Gije.

At the end of Be Invoked, he is reunited with Rapoh, who embraces him, much to his embarrassment.

Banda Lotta

A teenage girl from the planet Solo who becomes one of the civilian refugees aboard the Solo Ship.  Lotta's primary role aboard the ship is taking care of the young children along with Lin.  Lotta becomes upset with Karala and attempts to kill her since she is of the Buff Clan (in the movie version, she kills Karala's servant Mayaya), although in the end, she is unable to do it.

In the movie Be Invoked, Lotta acts a sentry when Karala's sister, Harulu, and her bodyguards, Torolof and Kilarul, board the Solo Ship in a chaotic battle. Lotta kills Torolof with a rocket launcher and is shot to death by Kilarul shortly afterwards.

She is reunited in spirit form with Lin Formosa and Fard at the end of the film.

Fard Malaka
One of the children on the Solo Ship. He is the most timid of the children and is scolded by Moera for not toughening up. He is killed in the final battle against the Buff Clan - the only time he decides to become brave and face the enemy. He is shot by one of the Buff Clan soldiers. However, it is left to the audience on whether or not he dies before the Solo ship is destroyed as he can be seen breathing after being shot.

Fard is reunited with Banda, Lin, and Ashura in spirit form at the end of Be Invoked.

Ashura Novak

One of the young children aboard the Solo Ship. Ashura's parents were killed in the attack on New Lopia.  She is the leader of the kids and is often seen leading Fard and Piper Lou in various activities. She doesn't understand very much the things that happen around her, but is often happy to help with any minor duties on the ship. She is killed in the final battle against the Buff Clan, when a blast of gunfire blows off her head.

Ahsura is later reunited with Fard in spirit form.

Piper Lou

A baby who is one of the refugees on the Solo Ship.  As the youngest member of the Solo Ship crew, Lou is critical to controlling the Ide, which responds with more power to young children like Lou.  In fact, the Ideon displays greater powers almost every time Lou is brought aboard. The Ide protects Lou and the children for they are of a new generation - representing the general innocence of children. As the series draws to a close and the true nature of the Ide becomes apparent, his survival becomes more critical to those aboard the Solo Ship.

In Be Invoked, Lou is nearly killed when Sheryl carries him onto the deck of the Solo Ship, hoping to draw out further power from the Ideon.  When the power of a blast from the Wave Leader Gun knocks him and Sheryl off the ship, Sheryl is killed, but Lou is protected by the Ide and returned to the ship. It is revealed that Lou and Karala's unborn child "Messiah" share a profound empathic connection, triggering enormous outputs of the Ide. Although he is the only character in Ideon to be spared a death sequence, Lou is killed when the Solo Ship is destroyed in the final battle.

Lou and Messiah lead the spirits of both races into the reborn universe.

Lin Formosa

Sheryl's younger sister, who is often seen taking care of the children along with Lotta.

She is killed in episode 37 of the series, while being held hostage by the colonists on the planet Ajian, led by the unstable Commodore.  She is shot dead as a demonstration that her captors are serious about killing the hostages unless the Solo Ship and Ideon are surrendered to the Buff Clan. Her death is avenged by Sheryl, who proceeds to gun down the Commodore.

Lin is reunited spiritually with Banda Lotta and Fard at the end of Be Invoked and watches as Sheryl and Gije arrive shortly after.

Rapoh Famu
The medic of the Solo Ship whose love interest is Moera. Along with Moera, Rapoh acts as a parental figure to the orphaned Fard. She is one of the last to die after being shot by a Buff Clan soldier in the final battle with the Buff Clan in Be Invoked.

She's last seen in spirit form, clinging on hysterically to a reluctant Moera as they follow everyone to the reborn universe.

Bento Malus

The co-pilot for the Ideo-Nova.  Bento is killed when the Ideon is hit by the first blast from the Gando Rowa.

Tekuno Gyabari

The co-pilot for the Ideo-Buster.  Tekuno is killed in the final battle when the Ideon is destroyed.

Rouri Yuki

Cosmo's father, an archeologist who is discovers the Ideon on the planet Solo. He is killed in the first episode when a bulldozer collapses on him.

Professor Formosa

Sheryl and Lin's father and a professor who wishes to test the Ide's capabilities, He is killed in the first episode and Movie A Contact after being crushed by a boulder.

Buff Clan

Karala Ajiba

Karala is the female lead in Space Runaway Ideon.  She is the youngest daughter of Doba Ajiba, the Supreme Commander of the Buff Clan military.  While investigating the Ide, Karala heads down to the planet Solo against orders and ends up stranded there.  After her alien origins are discovered, she is held captive on the Solo Ship, but her good hearted nature leads her to become a regular crew member on the Solo Ship despite being from the Buff Clan.  Although early in the series the Buff Clan constantly tries to rescue her, she becomes a traitor to the Buff Clan for associating with the Earthlings.  The one who despises her the most is her own sister, Harulu.

Karala and Bes fall in love and near the end of the series, Karala becomes pregnant with Bes's child, who is proclaimed 'Messiah' by Cosmo and Kasha.  Messiah is seen as the key to controlling the Ide and defending the Solo Ship against the Buff Clan, perhaps as well bringing a possible future peace between both races. However, when Harulu boards the Solo Ship during a battle, Karala confronts and tries to kill her, only to then be shot three times in the face and killed by Harulu.

Despite her tragic demise, Karala and Messiah remain as a strange ethereal influence as the carnage between the Buff Clan and Solo Ship rages onwards. Later, after everyone is killed, she and Bes reunite and watch as their son, Messiah, leads everyone to a new world.

Gije Zaral

The commander of the initial Buff Clan search expedition that discovers the planet Solo.  Gije is a friend and former fiance of Karala's, and hence is gravely concerned with her safety after she heads to the planet Solo.  Initially, he leads multiple operations to rescue Karala, but is later sent by Harulu to the Buff Clan homeworld to perform further study of the Ide.  After failing once again with the Buff Clan military, Gije is enlisted in the Ome Foundation, a private corporation that also seeks to capture the Ideon.  After multiple battles in which he fails to defeat the Ideon, Gije is abandoned on the moon, but he sneaks aboard the Solo Ship during a battle.  He befriends Sheryl, who shares a similar interest in the Ide, and the two eventually fall in love.  Although initially viewed as untrustworthy, Gije eventually becomes an official member of the Solo Ship crew and pilots the Ideo-Nova after the death of its pilot, Moera.  Gije is killed in a battle with the Buff Clan on the planet Steckin Star in episode 38 of the television series.

In Be Invoked, Gije's spirit pulls Sheryl's spirit from her body after she is killed in her foolish attempt to use Piper Lou to invoke the Ide, allowing for them to spend eternity together. Later on, after everyone is killed, both he and Sheryl reunite with the others.

Harulu Ajiba

The elder sister of Karala and daughter of Doba, the Supreme Commander of the Buff Clan military.  A high-ranking member of the Buff Clan military, Harulu leads the pursuit of the Solo Ship and Ideon for much of the first half of the series.  She views her younger sister as a traitor to the Buff Clan and despises her.  Harulu's former lover is Daram Zuba and, while she doesn't seem too pleased with him in their only meeting in the series, she mourns his death and even goes as far to have a Buff Clan officer assassinated when she laughs at a video of him.  When Harulu discovers that Karala is pregnant with a baby that is the key to controlling the Ide, she personally leads a team into the Solo Ship, where she murders Karala.  Afterwards, Doba gives her command of the entire Buff Clan army, but in the battle, she is killed by a blast from the Ideon's Wave Leader Gun.

At the end of Be Invoked, her spirit is shown being carried by Daram.

Doba Ajiba

The Supreme Commander of the Buff Clan military.  Doba is the father of both Karala and Harulu.  Like Harulu, Doba despises Karala for abandoning the Buff Clan and doesn't care whether she lives or dies.  Although he is largely absent for most of the TV series (appearing in only 3 episodes), he comes out of the woodwork near the end after his underlings repeatedly fail to defeat the Ideon.

Doba commands the Buff Clan forces from his flagship, the Bairal Jin.  Intent on not only defeating the Ideon, but also taking complete control of the Buff Clan, Doba conspires with Gindoro Jinmu of the Ome Foundation to overthrow the Buff Clan Emperor, Zuou Habel Gande, when the battle is over.  This becomes meaningless, however, when the Buff Clan's home planet is destroyed by a meteor shower.

Doba is eventually killed by his own soldiers when he makes it clear that the Ideon must be defeated, even if it results in the death of the majority of the Buff Clan.

Oddly enough, Doba is seen with Emperor Zuou at the end of Be Invoked when they greet Cosmo and Kasha.

Damido Pechi

One of the officers in charge of the initial expedition that results in the discovery of the Planet Solo, Damido is a colleague of Gije's and, along with him, pursues Karala early in the series.  Damido is much more aggressive than Gije and appears to be more concerned with wiping out the enemy than rescuing Karala. He is put out of commission for a while after a battle with the Ideon, but when he returns, he takes the opportunity to immediately strike the Ideon again.  His battle ends in failure yet again, and he perishes in this battle.  In the movie version, Damido has a much smaller role and is killed in the initial battle on Solo. After the final invocation, he is paired with Mayaya.

Daram Zuba

An officer in the Ome Foundation who is also Harulu's former lover.  Daram assists Harulu after her Dorowa Zan is destroyed in a fight against the Solo Ship.  He also leads the pursuit of the Solo Ship on the planet Kyaral, and later to Earth.  Daram betrays Gije by abandoning him on the moon, frustrated with his constant failures to defeat the Ideon.  Gije gets his revenge by shooting Daram in the head during a duel with Cosmo on the Earth.  In the movie version, Daram is not a member of the Ome Foundation, but rather a member of the regular Buff Clan military. In the movie, A Contact, he dies when his ship is blown up by the Ideon swords.

Daram is later shown carrying Harulu's spirit in his arms at the end of Be Invoked.

Gindoro Jinmu

Leader of the Ome Foundation, a private corporation that conspires with Doba to overthrow the Buff Clan Emperor.  Gindoro teams up with Doba at the end of the series after the Ome Foundation fails to defeat the Ideon.  After the Emperor's death, he remains with Doba for a period of time, but then requests to return to the Buff Clan homeworld, unaware that their home planet has been destroyed.  With the battle escalating, Gindoro tries to flee and argues with Doba, which results in him being killed.  His spirit talks to Doba shortly after his death.

Zou Habel Gande

Grand Emperor of the Buff Clan.  For reasons never explained, Doba desires to overthrow him.  A very minor character who only appears in one episode of the original TV series, Zou is killed when meteors destroy the Buff Clan homeworld.

At the end of Be Invoked, both his spirit and Doba appear and greet Cosmo and Kasha.

Abadede Gurimade
The initial commander of the Buff Clan investigation of Logo Dau (Solo) in the initial episodes and the main commander watching over Karala, Mayuyu, Gije, and Damido. He has a wife and child who he wishes to return home to. He is later killed on the planet Crystal Star, which he is forced to return to in pursuit of the Ideon after a previous expedition led to the destruction of his entire crew. In the end, he complains that he merely got a "fool's death" for ironically returning and being killed by the inhabitant creatures on that world.

Guhaba Geba
A subordinate of Harulu who is ordered by her to humiliate Karala when she reunites with her sister. He dies piloting a Zigg Mack in episode 14, trying to defeat the Ideon.

Later on, at the end of Be invoked, his spirit is reunited with Tolorof.

Doku Jilbal

Rukuku Kil

An officer in the Buff Clan military, with loyalties to the Emperor.  She is sent to Earth to defeat the Solo Ship and Ideon after the Ome Foundation fails to do so.  As a member of the military, she is rather arrogant towards Daram, but nonetheless allows him to fight under her command. Harulu sends an underling, Kulara Kina, to spy on her and when she find an old video of Daram and laughs at it, Harulu has her assassinated.

Hannibal Gen

Earth Union

Mark Jordan

Bes Father, A soldier, Mark was called in by Earth authorities in the hope of talking his son Bes into handing over the Solo Ship and the Ideon. Officers told him and his wife Elmi that Bes was committing treason.
He tried to reason with his son, but he remained convinced that giving the Sixth Civilisation technology to Earth would be a bad move. Mark and his wife left disappointed in him.

Elmi Jordan

Bes' Mother, she cares for Bes' Father who is a soldier. She tried to reason with her son, but he remained convinced that giving the Sixth Civilization technology to Earth would be a bad move. Elmi and her husband left disappointed in Bes.

Camyula Lanban
A female officer in the military base Braziller. She calms Cosmo down after a fight with the Buff Clan. Her personality traits and looks remind Cosmo of his mother. Her death motivates Cosmo's urge to fight.

Marshall Franklin

Kirarin Colbek

Frendali Limitter

Commander Leclan

Other characters

Kitty Kitten

A teenage girl who Cosmo meets on the colony planet of Kyaral.  Kitten is responsible for taking care of many of the orphaned children on her planet.  She desires for the Solo Ship to leave their planet so the Buff Clan will leave them alone, but decides to help Cosmo and the others in their quest for supplies.  She and Cosmo become good friends and Cosmo falls in love with her.  Kitten is killed when she is shot by Daram Zuba, who had fled to Kyaral in an escape pod after a battle with the Ideon.  In the movie version, she dies when she is decapitated in an explosion.  Her death greatly traumatizes Cosmo.

Later on, at the end of Be Invoked, her spirit appears, along with the children she looked at. She reunites with Kasha and Deck, who are watching over a sleeping Cosmo. After telling Deck to go on ahead, she awakens Cosmo with a kiss. When Cosmo apologizes for not being able to protect her, Kitty forgives him, saying that she was happy just being with him.

Gantsu Parkinson

Commodore

The leader of the planet Ajian after it is devastated by the Buff Clan's Light Speed Missiles.  Commodore blames the Solo Ship for this occurrence and teams up with Guldabra Dron of the Buff Clan when the Solo Ship returns to Ajian.  He tricks Bes and the others when they arrive and takes all the civilians on the ship as hostages; killing Lin when Bes and the others don't immediately surrender.  When Bes and the others arrive to rescue the hostages, Sheryl steals Bes' gun and shoots him. Gije puts him out of his misery.

Messiah

The hybrid unborn child of Bes Jordan and Karala Ajiba. Messiah's existence is revealed when Karala and Joliver are transported by the Ide to the Buff Clan's flagship, the Bairaru Jin. When she announces that she is pregnant with Bes's child, a series of events unfolds that leads to "Be Invoked"s tragic ending.

Even though he is not yet born, Messiah demonstrates enormous influence over the Ide, such as producing miniature protective fields around his mother and anything within range and is capable of communicating with Piper Lou in a manner of telepathy. Such abilities lead to Cosmo and Kasha dubbing the child "Messiah", as it seems he and Piper Lou may be the trumpcards capable of manifesting, if not controlling, the Ide's true strength.

Messiah seems to also represent a possibility of peace between the Earthlings and the Buff Clan, but his mother's death at the hands of his aunt prevents his physical birth from ever becoming a reality.

After the destruction of the universe, Messiah and Piper Lou spiritually lead the survivors of both races onwards to enlightenment, as their naked souls all collectively join to be "reborn" and witness the creation of a new universe.

Space Runaway Ideon